The 1998 International League season took place from April to September 1998.

The Buffalo Bisons defeated the Durham Bulls to win the league championship.

Triple-A realignment and expansion
Four new teams joined the International League in 1998. Three of these teams, the Buffalo Bisons, Indianapolis Indians, and the Louisville Redbirds joined as a result of the dissolution of the American Association. All three cities had previously competed in the IL at some point in time. One team, the Durham Bulls became a Triple-A expansion team. The Bulls were previously a Class A baseball team. As a result of these moves, the IL expanded from 10 teams to 14 teams. A new division, the IL South, was formed. The playoffs would be determined by the three division winners and one wild card winner.

Attendance
Buffalo Bisons - 768,749
Charlotte Knights - 299,664
Columbus Clippers - 488,674
Durham Bulls - 491,391
Indianapolis Indians - 659,237
Louisville Bats - 412,398
Norfolk Tides - 479,222
Ottawa Lynx - 224,371
Pawtucket Red Sox - 475,659
Richmond Braves - 528,230
Rochester Red Wings - 515,436
Scranton/Wilkes-Barre Red Barons - 406,735
Syracuse Chiefs - 420,488
Toledo Mud Hens - 311,652

Standings

Playoffs

Division Series
North Division Champion (Buffalo 81-62) defeated Wild Card Champion (Syracuse 80-62) 3 games to 2

South Division Champion (Durham 80-64) defeated West Division Champion (Louisville 77-67) 3 games to 1

Championship series
Buffalo defeated Durham 3 games to 2

Buffalo advanced on to the first Triple-A World Series in Las Vegas, Nevada. The World Series pitted the International League Champions (Buffalo) against the Pacific Coast League Champions (New Orleans). The New Orleans Zephyrs won the Series three games to one.

References

External links
International League official website 

 
International League seasons